Meinhard Charles "Monty" Pfyl (May 11, 1886 – October 18, 1945) was a Major League Baseball first baseman. In his lone career plate appearance, Pfyl was credited with a sacrifice hit.

Sources
, Retrosheet

Major League Baseball first basemen
New York Giants (NL) players
Cedar Rapids Rabbits players
Springfield Senators players
Baltimore Orioles (IL) players
Altoona Mountaineers players
Stockton Millers players
Oakland Oaks (baseball) players
Jersey City Skeeters players
Baseball players from St. Louis
1886 births
1945 deaths